Legend of Success Joe is a boxing video game developed by Wave Corporation and released for the Neo Geo arcade and home system. The game is based on Tomorrow's Joe , a manga created by Tetsuya Chiba and Asao Takamori in the early 1970s that was also adapted into several anime series. The game is also the first Neo Geo title developed by a third-party company. The game had a home system launch price of approximately US$200. While not released outside of Japan, a complete English translation can be seen when played on non-Japanese systems, which retitles the game's name.

Gameplay 

The player stars as Joe Yabuki, an aspiring boxer, as he goes from an unknown kid from the rough side of town to a boxing champion.  The game follows the traditional beat 'em up format, with some portions taking place inside a boxing ring and others taking place in the back alleyways, as Joe trains, fights thugs, and then fights in the boxing ring.

Reception 

In Japan, Game Machine listed Legend of Success Joe on their August 15, 1991 issue as being the tenth most-successful table arcade unit of the month, outperforming titles such as Hat Trick Hero. Despite the notability of the source material, the game was reviewed very poorly and did not receive a release outside Japan.  It is widely considered one of the worst games for the Neo Geo system, with common complaints being very poor gameplay control, inadequate graphics and poor animation on a system that was touted as not having these issues.

Notes

References

External links 
 Legend of Success Joe at GameFAQs
 Legend of Success Joe at Giant Bomb
 Legend of Success Joe at Killer List of Videogames
 Legend of Success Joe at MobyGames

1991 video games
Arcade video games
SNK beat 'em ups
Boxing video games
Fighting games
Japan-exclusive video games
Neo Geo games
Single-player video games
Video games based on anime and manga
Video games developed in Japan

ja:あしたのジョー